Bactra straminea is a moth of the family Tortricidae. It was first described by Arthur Gardiner Butler in 1881. It is only known from the Hawaiian islands of Kauai, Oahu, Molokai, Maui, Lanai and Hawaii, but might be an introduced species, although it has not been recorded from any other location.

Adults are extraordinarily variable in color, pattern, size and even in genitalia. In some varieties there is constant and conspicuous sexual dimorphism.

The larvae feed on Carex, Cladium angustifolium and Scirpus miritimus. They bore the stem of their host plant.

External links

Species info

Bactrini
Endemic moths of Hawaii